Regrinding the Axes   is the thirteenth  and at least as of 2022, is the most recent studio album by American southern rock band Molly Hatchet with a different order of the songs and some substitutions. "Free Bird" (Lynyrd Skynyrd), "Back In The USSR" (The Beatles), and "Yesterday" (The Beatles) have been inserted instead of "Desperado" (The Eagles). The three original live bonus tracks have been replaced with "Get In The Game" (from their 2005 album Warriors of the Rainbow Bridge), the instrumental part of "Layla" (Derek & The Dominos by Eric Clapton), and a live version of "Dreams I'll Never See" (Allman Brothers Band). (see 2008 in music).

Track listing

Personnel

Band members
Phil McCormack – lead and backing vocals
Bobby Ingram – guitars, acoustic guitar, slide guitar, backing vocals, producer, mixing
Dave Hlubek – guitars
John Galvin – keyboards, backing vocals
Tim Lindsey – bass, backing vocals
Shawn Beamer – drums, percussion

Additional musicians
Charlie Daniels - lead vocals on "Free Bird"

Production
Paul Lapinski - engineer, mixing, mastering
Scott Fravala, Daryl Pheeneger - engineers

References

Molly Hatchet albums
2012 compilation albums
Covers albums